Tony Stavrianos (Australia) was a rugby league footballer who played for the Eastern Suburbs club in the years 1962–64. Stavrianos died on 24 June 2017.

References

Year of birth missing
Sydney Roosters players
Place of birth missing
2017 deaths